It's About Time is an album by saxophonist Teddy Edwards with Les McCann's trio recorded in 1959 and released on the Pacific Jazz label.

Reception

Allmusic awarded the album three stars.

Track listing 
 "Our Love is Here to Stay" (George Gershwin, Ira Gershwin) - 5:35
 "Frankly Speaking" (Teddy Edwards) - 5:52
 "Fools Rush In" (Rube Bloom, Johnny Mercer) - 4:57
 "Undecided" (Sid Robin, Charlie Shavers) - 4:38
 "Beve's Comjumulations" (Les McCann) - 7:08
 "Willow Weep for Me" (Ann Ronell) - 5:24
 "Lover, Come Back to Me" (Sigmund Romberg, Oscar Hammerstein II) - 5:19

Personnel 
Teddy Edwards - tenor saxophone
Les McCann - piano
Leroy Vinnegar - bass
Ron Jefferson - drums

References 

Les McCann albums
Teddy Edwards albums
1960 albums
Pacific Jazz Records albums